Jairam Ramesh (born 9 April 1954) is an Indian politician belonging to Indian National Congress. He is a Member of Parliament representing Karnataka state in the Rajya Sabha. In July 2011, Jairam was elevated to the Union Council of Ministers of India and appointed Minister of Rural Development and Minister (additional charge) of the new Ministry of Drinking Water and Sanitation. However, in the cabinet reshuffle in October 2012, he has been divested of the portfolio of Ministry of Drinking Water and Sanitation. He was previously the Indian Minister of State (Independent Charge) at the Ministry of Environment and Forests from May 2009 to July 2011.

Personal 
Jairam Ramesh was born on 9 April 1954 in Chikmagalur, Karnataka, India. His father was C. K. Ramesh, and his mother, Sridevi Ramesh. His father was a Professor of Civil Engineering in IIT Bombay. He considers himself a practising Hindu with Buddhism ingrained and calls himself a 'Hind-Budh'.

He married K. R. Jayashree on 26 January 1981. He currently resides at Lodi Gardens, Rajesh Pilot Marg, New Delhi. Till his election to Rajya Sabha from Karnataka in July 2016, his permanent residence was at Khairatabad, Hyderabad, Telangana. His wife died in early 2019.

Since childhood, Jairam has been strongly influenced by Jawaharlal Nehru. He was fascinated by Nehru's modern approach to life, his bringing change in a traditional society and his liberal, humanist, rational approach to life, religion, men and civic matters. He considers himself a product of the Nehruvian era in many ways. An additional influence was Mahatma Gandhi, whom he originally saw as anti-modern, anti-science and anti-West. As he grew older and read Gandhi more and viewed him in the political and historical context in which he operated, he came to appreciate and acknowledge Gandhi much more. He has also studied Rabindranath Tagore deeply.

Education
Jairam attended St. Xavier's School, Ranchi in 1961–1963 in classes 3 to 5. He read Paul Samuelson (an American economist who won the Nobel Prize in 1970) and found him very interesting.  His presentation, the substance of issues such as population and growth got him thinking of economics and the larger issues of life. Also when he was 17, in 1971, he read Asian Drama, one of the early books of Gunnar Myrdal (a Swedish economist who won the Nobel Prize in 1974) and wrote to him at the Stockholm International Peace Research Institute. Myrdal sent a very nice reply and said to stay in touch with him. Asian Drama was very influential to Jairam's understanding of development planning in India.

Jairam graduated from IIT Bombay in 1975 with a B.Tech. in Mechanical Engineering. Between 1975–77 he studied at Carnegie Mellon University's Heinz College and received a Master of Science in Public Policy and Public Management. In 1977–78, he started on the Doctoral program at the Massachusetts Institute of Technology, where he had planned to study technology policy, economics, engineering, and management, as part of the newly established interdisciplinary technology policy programme. Family exigencies required him to return to India and that program remained incomplete.

He is a member of the International Council of the New York-based Asia Society. Jairam has been a Visiting Fellow and Affiliated Researcher of the Institute of Chinese Studies, New Delhi, since 2002.

Career
In 1978, Jairam joined the World Bank for a short assignment. He returned to India in December 1979 and worked as assistant to economist Lovraj Kumar at the Bureau of Industrial Costs and Prices. From 1983 to 1985 he was Officer on Special Duty in the Advisory Board of Energy. He then worked in the Planning Commission (advisor to Abid Hussain), Ministry of Industry and other economic departments of the Central Government, including: analysing energy policy during 1983–85, reorganising the CSIR in 1986 and implementing technology missions during 1987–89.

In 1990, he worked as an "Officer on Special Duty" during the National Front administration of the V.P. Singh government. He reorganised India's international trade agencies in 1990 and was OSD to the Prime Minister in 1991. But he was removed from PMO within few weeks. In 1991 he worked in Manmohan Singh's finance ministry in the P. V. Narasimha Rao administration.

Jairam participated in India's economic reforms in 1991 and 1997. He was advisor to the Deputy Chairman of the Planning Commission in 1992–94, served on special mission to Jammu and Kashmir during 1993–95 and was advisor to Finance Minister Palaniappan Chidambaram between 1996–98. The central government invited him to join the official delegation to the World Trade Organization meeting in Seattle in 1999.

From 2000–2002, Jairam served as Deputy chairman, State Planning Board, Government of Karnataka and on the Economic Advisory Council of Andhra Pradesh. He also served on the eminent persons group of the Union Ministry of Power and other key government committees.

Jairam also served as Secretary in the All India Congress Committee, Deputy Chairman of the Karnataka Planning Board (2000–2002), member of the Rajasthan Development Council (1999–2003), and Economic Advisor to the government of the state of Chhattisgarh (2001–03). He was a member of the Congress Party's electoral strategy team for the 2004 Lok Sabha cycle.

In June 2004, he was elected to represent Adilabad District, Andhra Pradesh in the Rajya Sabha. Following the formation of the Congress-led United Progressive Alliance (UPA) government in 2004, he joined the National Advisory Council, where he helped put together UPA's National Common Minimum Program. From August 2004 – January 2006 he was a member of three committees of Parliament: the Public Accounts Committee, the Standing Committee on Finance and the Committee on Government Assurances and was a member of the Court of the Jawaharlal Nehru University.

In February 2009, with the 15th Lok Sabha elections approaching, he led the party's Poll Strategy Panel. At that time he resigned his posts as Minister of State for Power and Minister of State for Commerce and Industry.

Following his 2009 re-election to the Indian Parliament, on 28 May 2009 Jairam was given independent charge of Environment and Forests as Minister of State in the Congress-led administration. He was chief negotiator for India at the 2009 United Nations Climate Change Conference held in Copenhagen, Denmark, between 7 and 18 December 2009.

Jairam was part of the 19-member 'Foundation Day Committee' of the All India Congress Committee (AICC), under the chairmanship of party president Sonia Gandhi, for planning the 2010 year-long celebrations of the 125th anniversary of the Congress Party. 

On 12 July 2011, Jairam was promoted to Cabinet Minister and reassigned to charge of the Ministry for Rural Development and on 13 July 2011 was named Minister (Additional Charge) of the new Ministry of Drinking Water and Sanitation.

He was instrumental, as minister for environments and forests in 2011, in banning the use of bulls as performing animals. This then led to the ban of Jallikattu in Tamil Nadu in 2016.

During his tenure, he falsely accused the villagers of Pithampur in Madhya Pradesh to secretly smuggle out toxic waste from Carbide factory and dump it. Later he had to apologise and also assured that he would not repeat such action and will take villagers in consultation.

Currently, Jairam has been appointed a member of a board which provides strategic policy advice to a key UN agency on environmentally-sound technologies for developing nations.

Jairam has accepted the offer to serve as a member of the International Advisory Board (IAB) which gives strategic policy advice to the Executive Director of United Nations Environment Programme (UNEP) on the programmatic direction of International Environmental Technology Centre (IETC).

On 19 December 2020, Jairam tendered apology to Vivek Doval and his family in regard to defamation case filed by latter, after Jairam accused Vivek Doval of dealing with black money syndicate as per an article published in The Caravan under the title of The D Companies. Jairam was out on bail issued in May 2019 by Delhi High Court.

On 16 June 2022, Jairam was appointed head of Media, including social & Digital media of Indian National Congress Party. 

Jairam Ramesh became a Member of Parliament, Rajya Sabha from Indian National Congress Party nomination.

Journalism
Jairam's been a columnist for the Business Standard, Business Today, The Telegraph, Times of India and India Today, sometimes under the pen-name "Kautilya".

He has also anchored a number of popular television programmes on business and the economy, including Business Breakfast and Crossfire.
Jairam is the author of the books:

Making Sense of Chindia: Reflections on China and India (2005), Foreword by Strobe Talbott.
 Mobilising Technology for World Development (Co-editor, 1979)
 To The Brink and Back : India's 1991 Story (2015)
 One History, New Geography (2016)
 Indira Gandhi: A Life in Nature (2017)
 Intertwined Lives: P.N. Haksar & Indira Gandhi (2018)
 A Chequered Brilliance: The Many Lives of V.K. Krishna Menon (2019)
 THE LIGHT OF ASIA (2021)

See also
 Ministry of Commerce and Industry (India)
 Ministry of Power (India)

References

Citations

External links

 An interview with Jairam Ramesh 27 June 2009
 Rajya Sabha biodata
 National Advisory Council Profile
 Profile on Rediff.com
 Resources on Ministry and Environment and Forests (MoEF)

1954 births
Living people
Indian National Congress politicians from Andhra Pradesh
20th-century Indian economists
Union ministers of state of India
IIT Bombay alumni
Heinz College of Information Systems and Public Policy alumni
Massachusetts Institute of Technology alumni
People from Chikkamagaluru
Members of the Cabinet of India
Rajya Sabha members from Andhra Pradesh
Lok Sabha members from Andhra Pradesh
Telugu politicians
Scientists from Andhra Pradesh
India MPs 2004–2009
India MPs 2009–2014
India MPs 2014–2019
Rajya Sabha members from Karnataka